Flag dipping refers to the movement of a flag as a signal.

Dipping may also refer to:
 Treating sheep with a liquid formulation of insecticide and fungicide in a sheep dip
 Treating livestock with pesticides by walking them through a plunge dip
 Practicing the exercise known as the dip (exercise)
 Practicing the dance movement known as the dip (dance move)
 The practice of using dipping tobacco
 A brief session of swimming, as in skinny dipping
 An old term for baptism
 Bright dipping, a process of removing oxides from non-ferrous metals in chrome plating
 Treating a coin in a dilute acid solution as a way to clean it

See also
 Dip (disambiguation)